This is a nonexhaustive list of schools that offer degrees in quantitative psychology or related fields such as psychometrics or research methodology. Programs are typically offered in departments of psychology, educational psychology, or human development. Various organizations, including the American Psychological Association's Division 5, the Canadian Psychological Association, the National Council for Measurement in Education, and the Society of Multivariate Experimental Psychology have compiled lists of programs.

Graduate degree programs

Structure 

Records are listed alphabetically by university in descending order. Within a given university, records are sorted by degree (doctorate, then master's). Inclusion criteria are described on the talk page.
 University section
 University – The university listed is the primary institution/organization which grants the degree. The link provided links to the Wikipedia page for the university.
 Department – The department listed is the primary department which grants the degree. The link provided links to the department's website.
 Program section
 Terminal degree – This is the final degree granted to the student within that degree track. Many doctoral programs in the US have joint MA/Ph.D programs. Those degrees are listed within the same record under the final degree granted (e.g., Doctorate of Philosophy). The link provided directs to the description of the degree.
 Program – This is the name of the degree program. The link typically directs to the degree requirements. Many times the Terminal Degree page and the Program page are the same.
 Specialty – This subsection identifies various tracks within a degree program. Not all programs have this level of specialty. If applicable, the link directs to the primary page detailing the specialization requirements.
 Faculty – This section lists the tenured/tenure-track faculty currently listed on the program's website with a primary appointment. Emeritus professors are excluded from this list.
 Source – The source lists the academic organization which identified the program as a quantitative program. Multiple organizations can be listed. See the talk page for more details.

List of formal degrees

Select minors and certificates in quantitative methods 
 Ball State University
 University of California, Riverside
 Kent State University
 Michigan State University
 New York University
 Ohio State University
 Washington State University
 Texas Christian University
 Virginia Tech

References 

Lists of schools
Higher education-related lists
Schools for quantitative psychology, list of
University and college departments by discipline
Quantitative research
Psychometrics
Statistics-related lists
Quantitative psychology